The Lonely Road is a lost 1923 silent film drama directed by Victor Schertzinger and starring Katherine MacDonald. It was produced by B. P. Schulberg and released through Associated First National.

Cast
Katherine MacDonald – Betty Austin
Orville Caldwell – Warren Wade
Kathleen Kirkham – Leila Mead
Eugenie Besserer – Martha True
William Conklin – Dr. Devereaux
James Neill – Uncle Billy Austin
Frank Leigh – Stewart Bartley
Charles K. French – Hiram Wade
Stanley Goethals – The Wade's Son

References

External links

1923 films
American silent feature films
Lost American films
Films directed by Victor Schertzinger
First National Pictures films
American black-and-white films
Silent American drama films
1923 drama films
1923 lost films
Lost drama films
Preferred Pictures films
1920s American films